The Front Street Block is a series of four connected commercial blocks in the West End of Gloucester, Massachusetts, USA.  They were built in 1831 after a fire had devastated Gloucester's downtown the previous year.
69–71 Main Street, a three-story four wide block with Federalist styling, was built for Aaron Day.  A hat maker operated on the ground floor, and apartments were above.
65–67 Main Street, a three-story four wide block with Federalist styling, was built for Samuel Bulkley.  A "tin manufactory" operated on the ground floor, and there were apartments above.  This building shared a wall with 69-71.
61–63 Main Street, also three stories and four wide, was built for William Babson, Jr., and had a shop on the ground floor with apartments above.  In 1890 this building was renovated, giving it a new Victorian facade, and an enlarging addition to the rear.
55–59 Main Street is distinct from the other three buildings in being only two stories, and for having a hipped roof.  It was built for Henry Smith, and first housed a cabinet maker on the ground floor, with living space above.

They were collectively listed as a historic district on the National Register of Historic Places in 1974, and further included in the Central Gloucester Historic District in 1982.

See also
National Register of Historic Places listings in Gloucester, Massachusetts
National Register of Historic Places listings in Essex County, Massachusetts

References

Historic districts on the National Register of Historic Places in Massachusetts
Buildings and structures in Gloucester, Massachusetts
National Register of Historic Places in Essex County, Massachusetts
Historic district contributing properties in Massachusetts